The second series of the British medical drama television series Casualty commenced airing in the United Kingdom on BBC One on 12 September 1987 and finished on 19 December 1987.

Production

While the first series of Casualty had been filmed in London, a permanent place for the Set had now been found – a warehouse in Bristol. However, accompanying the publicity for the start of the new series were comments by producer Geraint Morris that there would be no more programmes, stating quite unequivocally that: "We felt it should end on a high after thirty episodes." 

Once again as the characters of Holby's A&E department battled to save their night shift on screen, off screen a similar battle was being waged – and won. After six weeks on air, the critics were finally warming to the series and there were no longer any Government complaints about content. Following the dramatic episode Cry For Help, in which Paramedic Sandra Mute is stabbed the programme seemed to secure audiences of more than 10 million and therefore a sense of security to the programme. 

An example of the series' now infamous tendency to bare similarity to real life events came during an episode where the team had to dig out bodies from a house bombed in an IRA attack. Just hours after being screen, an IRA bomb ripped through Enniskillen. It seemed that the writers had put their fingers on the country's pulse without exaggeration and from that point onwards no one dared to call it far-fetched again.

Cast

Overview
The second series of Casualty features a cast of characters working in the emergency department of Holby City Hospital. The majority of the cast from the previous series continue to appear in this series. Bernard Gallagher portrayed emergency medicine consultant Ewart Plimmer. Derek Thompson appeared as charge nurse Charlie Fairhead, whilst Cathy Shipton starred as staff nurse Lisa "Duffy" Duffin. Brenda Fricker played state enrolled nurse Megan Roach. Lisa Bowerman and Robert Pugh portrayed paramedics Sandra Mute and Andrew Ponting. Debbie Roza starred as receptionist Susie Mercier while Christopher Rozycki appeared as porter Kuba Trzcinski. Nigel Anthony and Sonia Woolley also appear as Ted Roach and Ros Plimmer in a recurring capacity. 

Helena Little joined the cast in episode one as senior house officer Mary Tomlinson as did Maureen O'Brien who began portraying administrator Elizabeth Straker. Both characters departed at the end of the series. Kate Hardie and Eddie Nestor were cast in the roles of student nurses Karen O'Malley and Cyril James respectively. Cyril was later promoted to staff nurse. Hardie departed the series in episode ten. Bowerman chose to leave the series and her character Sandra was killed off in episode four. Pugh also left the series, with Andrew departing in episode six. They were subsequently replaced within the cast by Ella Wilder and Geoffrey Leesley, who began portraying paramedics Shirley Franklin and Keith Cotterill respectively from episode seven. Roza chose to leave the series, with Susie departing at the end of the series.

Main characters 

Lisa Bowerman as Sandra Mute (until episode 4)
Brenda Fricker as Megan Roach
Bernard Gallagher as Ewart Plimmer
Kate Hardie as Karen O'Malley (episodes 2−10)

Helena Little as Mary Tomlinson (episodes 1−15)
Eddie Nestor as Cyril James (from episode 2)

Robert Pugh as Andrew Ponting (until episode 6)
Debbie Roza as Susie Mercier (until episode 15)
Christopher Rozycki as Kuba Trzcinski
Cathy Shipton as Lisa "Duffy" Duffin
Derek Thompson as Charlie Fairhead
Ella Wilder as Shirley Franklin (from episode 7)

Recurring characters 
Nigel Anthony as Ted Roach
Sonia Woolley as Ros Plimmer

Episodes

References

External links
 Casualty series 2 at the Internet Movie Database

02
1987 British television seasons